Caetano Veloso is the debut solo album by the artist of the same name, released in Brazil in 1968. He had released Domingo the year before in collaboration with Gal Costa. It was one of the first Tropicália efforts, and features arrangements by Júlio Medaglia, Damiano Cozzella, and Sandino Hohagen, as well as an eclectic assortment of influences, demonstrating the "antropofagia" (artistic cannibalism) of the Tropicália movement. Sounds from psychedelia, rock, pop, Indian music, bossa nova, Bahian music and other genres appear on the album. It includes the hit songs "Alegria, Alegria", "Tropicália", and "Soy loco por ti, América".

Background 
Recorded to capitalize on the success of the forward-looking "Alegria, Alegria" at the TV Record Festival, the album mostly continued in the new direction in which Caetano and his fellow tropicalistas (though that term had not yet been employed to describe them) wanted to take Brazilian popular music. Where his debut Domingo had been primarily based on more traditional Brazilian musical styles such as bossa nova, his second album relied heavily on sounds and instrumentation more common to rock and roll and psychedelia.

Notable songs

"Tropicália"
The album's opener gets its title from the Hélio Oiticica installation of the same name; Caetano's appropriation of the title was the basis for his initial association with the term, which later lent its name to the art movement of which he was a central figure, Tropicalismo. The song's lyrics do not mention the title or refer to it directly. In fact, Caetano had already completed the song's composition when film producer Luiz Carlos Barreto suggested "Tropicália" as its title, seeing similarities between its content and that of the art exhibit. Caetano, who had never heard of Oiticica or his work up to that point, resolved to use the title until he found a better one, which he never did.

The Noel Rosa song "Coisas nossas", with its listing of various elements of Brazilian society, inspired the lyrics to "Tropicália", which similarly list cultural icons, such as the Portuguese-born but Brazilian-raised international superstar Carmen Miranda, a line from the popular Roberto Carlos song "Quero que tudo vá pro inferno", and the Louis Malle film Viva Maria.

The song was voted by the Brazilian edition of Rolling Stone as the 21st greatest Brazilian song.

"Alegria, Alegria"

Reception 

Caetano has expressed displeasure with the album, calling it "amateurish and confused", but it is widely regarded as a classic, often showing up on lists of greatest Brazilian albums. It was very popular upon its release in Brazil, and the Brazilian press used the song title "Tropicália" to christen the larger artistic movement it represented "Tropicalismo", to the disdain of Caetano himself. The album was inducted into the Latin Grammy Award Hall of Fame in 2001.

Track listing

Personnel 
 Caetano Veloso – Guitar, vocals, liner notes
 David Drew Zingg – Photography

References 

1968 albums
Caetano Veloso albums
Portuguese-language albums
Albums produced by Manuel Barenbein
Latin Grammy Hall of Fame Award recipients
Philips Records albums